Metropolitan Music Co. may refer to:
 Metropolitan Music Co. (Minneapolis), a Minneapolis-based music publishing company and string instrument retailer founded the late 1800s
 Metropolitan Music Co., an orchestral string instrument wholesaler founded in 1920 and exclusive distributor of John Juzek violins, violas, cellos, and double basses